Majid Mohammadi is an Iranian-American author. He is the author of dozens of books in Persian, Arabic and English. Majid Mohammadi also is a faculty member at Tavaana: E-Learning Institute for Iranian Civil Society, where he teaches Persian-language online courses on civil society in Iran.

Works

30 Books in English including
 "Islamic Mayhem, Shi`i Style: How Does Khamenei Rule Iran?" Google Play, 2000
 "Under the Leader’s Cloak," IIIS, Riyadh, SA, 2020
 "Ideological and Institutional Aspects of Islamicization Process: How Islamism and Shari`ah Contravene Life, Liberty, and Pursuit of Happiness," New York: Google Play, 2018
 "Analytical Sociology: What Can We Learn from Sociological Theories?" New York: Google Play, 2018
 Judicial Reform and Reorganization In 20th Century Iran, New York: Routledge, 2008.
 Iran's Constitution, Amsterdam: Kluwer, 2012  
 Political Islam in Post-Revolutionary Iran: Shi'i Ideologies in Islamist Discourse , London: I.B. Tauris, 2015
 Iranian Reform Movement: Civil and Constitutional Rights in Suspension , London: Palgrave Macmillan, 2018
 Ideological and Institutional Aspects of Islamicization Process: How Islamism and Shari`ah Contravene Life, Liberty, and Pursuit of Happiness, New York: Google Play, 2018
 Analytical Sociology: What Can We Learn from Sociological Theories?, New York: Google Play, 2018

3 Books in Arabic
 "Trends of Contemporary Religious Thought in Iran," International Institute of Islamic Thought (IIIT), 2010 
 "Ashura in Secular Age," Google Play/Amazon, 2021
 "Iran Under Islamists: Descent into Chaos, Catastrophe, Misery, and Destruction," Google Play/Amazon, 2021

more than 80 Books in Persian including
 "Iranian Propaganda Machine," Google Play, 2019
 "Why Can’t They? The Whats and the Hows of the Islamic Republic’s Opposition," Ketab Corp, 2018
 "A Look at the Institutions and Decision Making of the Judiciary in the Islamic Republic of Iran," Washington DC: Tavaana, 2016
 "The End of Spring", Los Angeles: Sherkat-e Ketab, 2015
 "Three Political Programs in Contemporary Iran: Constitutional Monarchy/Guardianship, Republicanism, Absolute Authoritarianism", Los Angeles: Sherkat-e Ketab, 2015
 The Leader of Muslim Affairs in the World, Los Angeles: Sherkat-e Ketab, 2012
 Religion and Communications, Tehran: Kavir, 2003
 Heaven’s Ladder: Analytic Philosophy of Religion, Tehran: Markaz, 2002
 New Iranian Cinema, 1983-2000, Tehran: Jame’eh ye Iranian, 2002
 Mystery of Dialogue, Tehran: Cultural Relation Association (one chapter translated to Urdu), 2002
 Authoritarian Face: Iranian TV, 1990-2000, Tehran: Jame’eh ye   Iranian, 2001
 Satellites, Tehran: Ghatreh, 2001
 Media Ethics, Tehran: Naghsh-o Negar, 2001
 Ethical Systems in Iran and Islam, Tehran: Kavir, 2001
 Iranian Liberalism, Tehran: Jame’eh ye Iranian, 2001
 Political Reforms Quandary in Iran Today, Tehran: Jame’eh ye Iranian, 2000
 Civil Society: Iranian Style, Tehran: Markaz, 1999
 An Introduction to Political Behavior of Iranian Students: 1979-99, Tehran: Kavir, 1999
 Religion vs. Faith, Tehran: Kavir, 1999
 Multimedia, Tehran: Ghatreh, 1998
 An Introduction to Sociology and Economics of Culture in Iran Today, Tehran: Ghatreh, 1998
 Otherwise, Philosophy of Life, Tehran: Ghatreh, 1998
 Philosophical Problems, Tehran: Ghalam, 1998
 Civil Society as a Method, Tehran: Ghatreh, 1997
 Cable Communications, Tehran: Ghatreh, 1997
 Informational Superhighways, Tehran: Ghatreh, 1997
 Contemporary Theology in Iran, Tehran: Ghatreh (also translated to Arabic), 1995
 Cinema and Life, Tehran: Mina, 1992
 Religious Pathology, Tehran: Tafakkor, 1992
 Technology: Logic, Method, Tehran: Chapakhsh, 1991
 Technique of Film Analysis, Tehran: Nai, 1990

Majid Mohammadi also was a faculty member at Tavaana: E-Learning Institute for Iranian Civil Society, where he taught Persian-language online courses on civil society in Iran.

References

Living people
Stony Brook University alumni
Persian-language writers
21st-century American writers
Faculty of Letters and Humanities of the University of Tehran alumni
Qom Seminary alumni
1960 births